The Blackburn B-1 Segrave was a 1930s British twin-engine four-seat touring aircraft built by Blackburn Aircraft.

History
The aircraft was designed by the racing driver (and world land speed record holder) Sir Henry Segrave as a twin-engine four-seat touring monoplane. A wooden prototype, designated Saro Segrave Meteor I was built by Saunders Roe at Cowes. The prototype (registered G-AAXP) first flew on 28 May 1930. Development was delayed by the death of the designer on 13 June 1930 in a speedboat accident. The aircraft was demonstrated in Rome to the Italian Air Ministry, and a licence agreement was signed to produce the aircraft as the Piaggio P.12, although only two appear to have been made. With lack of space at Cowes and with the decision to build a metal version, two aircraft were built by Blackburn Aircraft at Brough Aerodrome with the designation Blackburn CA.18 Segrave. Blackburn changed the designation system, and the aircraft became the Blackburn B.1 Segrave.

Despite sales tours around Europe, the aircraft was not ordered, and only one further example was built. This was completed by Blackburn as the Blackburn CA.20 Segrave II to test a new single-spar wing.

Aircraft
Segrave Meteor (registration G-AAXP)
After use as a demonstrator, it was in private use until withdrawn from use at Brough in 1932.

Segrave I (registration G-ABFP)
The first metal version was used by the British Air Navigation Company for cross-Channel charters, then sold for private use; scrapped at Brough in 1934.

Segrave I (registration G-ABFR)
Was used by the North Sea Aerial & General Transport Company until 1935, mainly as a ferry across the River Humber, when it was sold to British Air Transport at Redhill Aerodrome. It was withdrawn from use in 1938.

Segrave II (registration G-ACMI)
First flown 2 February 1934, it was used by Blackburn for trials, until it was dismantled at Brough in 1935. It was later presented to Loughborough College as an instructional airframe.

Piaggio P.12
Licensed version, two built.

Specifications (Segrave I)

See also

References

Blackburn Segrave – British Aircraft Directory

External links

Photo of Segrave Meteor in Flight

Segrave
1930s British civil utility aircraft
Low-wing aircraft
Segrave
Aircraft first flown in 1930
Twin piston-engined tractor aircraft